Utricularia tridentata is a small terrestrial carnivorous plant that belongs to the genus Utricularia. U. tridentata is endemic to South America, where it is found in Argentina, Brazil, and Uruguay.

See also 
 List of Utricularia species

References 

Carnivorous plants of South America
Flora of Argentina
Flora of Brazil
Flora of Uruguay
tridentata